World Serpent or World Snake may refer to:

 Antaboga, the world serpent of traditional Javanese mythology
 Jörmungandr, also known as the Midgard Serpent, in Norse mythology
 Ouroboros, a world serpent or dragon swallowing its own tail
 Shesha, the serpent containing the universe in Hindu mythology
 World Serpent, a deity in the Dungeons & Dragons campaign setting Forgotten Realms 
 World Serpent Distribution, defunct British record label and music distribution house

Serpent